General elections were held in the Netherlands on 16 June 1905. The Liberal Union remained the largest party, winning 34 of the 100 seats in the House of Representatives.

Results

References

General elections in the Netherlands
Netherlands
1905 in the Netherlands
Election and referendum articles with incomplete results
1905 elections in the Netherlands
June 1905 events